The 114th district of the Texas House of Representatives contains parts of Dallas. The current Representative is John Turner, who has represented the district since 2019.

References 

114